The Lenovo Legion Duel 2, known as the Lenovo Legion 2 Pro in China, is an Android gaming smartphone that was released on April 8, 2021.

Design 
The phone features a bump on the back which houses the camera assembly, flash, and dual fans that cool the Qualcomm Snapdragon 888 system-on-a-chip. This bump has been shown to be a weakness. The phone contains dual USB Type C connectors that are used to charge the 5500 mAh battery. The phone comes in both black and white color variations.

References 

Mobile phones introduced in 2021

Lenovo Legion
Lenovo smartphones
Mobile phones with multiple rear cameras
Mobile phones with 8K video recording